The Troldborg Ring is an Iron Age fortification in Vejle Municipality in Denmark,  west of the city of Vejle. It is located at a natural spring on a high point overlooking the Vejle River Valley. The surrounding area is a steep ravine known as the Devil's Valley. The site consists of a raised area of about  surrounded by a circular rampart.

The Troldborg Ring was built around the years 100-200 during a period of turbulence in Denmark, and it was used until around the year 400. It likely served as a refuge during times of violence rather than a permanent dwelling. Its placement suggests that the area was strategically important even before the bridge was built. A considerable amount of ash from massive fires has been found at the site, although the source and timing of these fires is unclear.

References 

Archaeological sites in Denmark
Former buildings and structures in Denmark
Iron Age sites in Europe
Forts in Denmark
Vejle Municipality
Buildings and structures completed in the 3rd century